Sucarnoochee may refer to:

Sucarnoochee, Mississippi, a community in Kemper County, Mississippi
Sucarnoochee River, a river in Kemper County, Mississippi and Sumter County, Alabama